Amar Singh College (Urdu: ,) is an academic & professional college in Srinagar, Jammu and Kashmir, India. It is the second oldest college in the Kashmir Valley after Sri Pratap College.

History 
It was established in November 1913 as Amar Singh Technical Institute, to teach willing students art, culture, and basics like masonry and carpentry. It was formally opened on 29 May 1914 by Maharaja Pratap Singh. In June 1942, the Technical Institute was converted into Amar Singh College through bifurcation of Sri Pratap College commemorating the name of the father of Hari Singh, the then Maharaja of Kashmir. The College was recognized by  University Grants Commission of India (UGC) in June  1972. The College is accredited by National Assessment and Accreditation Council [NAAC] with B++ Grade.

Location 
The college is located in Wazir Bagh, in the city of Srinagar (74o-48 `N latitude, 34o-03 `E longitude and 1589m altitude). It is spread over 35 hectares of land divided into a large play ground, parks, gardens, and an infrastructural area.

At present, the college has multiple academic buildings making a total built-up area of about 30000m2. This includes the glorious heritage building, representing the finest blend of Anglo-Indian architecture, constructed in 1910 for running a technical institute. Presently it houses chemistry department, teaching staff room, UGC, IQAC Cell, NSS and NCC rooms, besides having six lecture theaters and three large halls for the conduct of examinations. The heritage building had got damages during earthquake in 2005 and devastating flood in September 2014. However, it was repaired and restored to its actual look in 2017-18 by J&K Government through INTAC. It was made possible through the personal efforts of then Principal Prof. Yasmeen Ashaie.

About the College 
Amar Singh College, Srinagar, is a nodal college for Kashmir Division acting as a liaison between departments of higher education and about fifty government colleges of the providence.
The college has a well equipped library with a collection of about 70,000 books including a collection of rare books.
The college offers Undergraduate courses in Science, Arts, Commerce and Computer applications, and Postgraduate studies in geography.
The college also offers UGC sponsored add-on job-oriented courses in information technology, video editing, computer application, and web design.
The college is also one of the Special Study centers of IGNOU

Facilities 
Library 
Computer Labs
Auditorium
Gymkhana
Canteen
Classrooms
Sports and Games
Hostel
National service scheme (NSS)
National Cadet Corps (NCC)

JKIMS
Jammu and Kashmir Institute of Mathematical Sciences or JKIMS is an autonomous public institution under recognition of University of Kashmir, situated inside the campus of Amar Singh College Srinagar in Indian administered Jammu and Kashmir, which was established in 2014 by the higher education department of government of Jammu and Kashmir.

Famous alumni
 Major General Mohammed Amin Naik, (Chief Engineer, Central Army Command, and first Kashmiri General in the Indian Army)
Prof. Amitabh Mattoo
Mehrajuddin Wadoo - Football Player
Chewang Norphel - Indian Civil Engineer
Keshav Malik - Poet
Kacho Sikander Khan - Writer
Shahnaz Bashir - Writer

References

Degree colleges in Kashmir Division
Universities and colleges in Srinagar
Colleges affiliated to University of Kashmir
1913 establishments in India
Educational institutions established in 1913
Colleges affiliated to Cluster University of Srinagar